River Road is a census-designated place (CDP) adjacent to the city of Eugene in Lane County, Oregon, United States. It was first listed as a CDP prior to the 2020 census.

The CDP is in north-central Lane County, on the northwest side of Eugene. It extends from the junction of River Road and the Northwest Expressway in the south to Oregon Route 569, the Randy Papé Beltline, in the north. River Road and the Northwest Expressway form the eastern and western boundaries of the CDP, respectively. Numerous outlying areas belonging to the city of Eugene are scattered throughout the CDP, which is otherwise unincorporated.

River Road is an extremely car-dependent area with multiple pedestrian and car fatalities per year.  However, as part of EmX's Moving Ahead initiative establishing a bus rapid transit lane and protected bike lanes, more transit options will become available to residents.  These changes have proven highly controversial, and the City Councillor representing River Road, Claire Syrett, is facing a recall election as of August 2022.

Demographics

References 

Census-designated places in Lane County, Oregon
Census-designated places in Oregon